The Embrace Cultural and Creative Park is a multi-purpose park in Xinyi District, Keelung, Taiwan.

Exhibitions
 The Starry Night

See also
 List of tourist attractions in Taiwan

References

External links

  
Cemeteries in Taiwan
Arts centres in Taiwan
Cultural centers in Keelung